Hans Wegmueller was born in Switzerland and was head of the Swiss intelligence agencies from 2001–2008. He joined the service in 1978. In 2018 he became a founding director of a private intelligence firm.

Education 

 Master of Arts in History, English Linguistics and Ecclesiastical History, Basle University, 1978.
 PhD in Military History, Zurich University, 1994.
 Master of Arts in National Security Affairs, Naval Postgraduate School in Monterey (USA), 1976.

References 

Year of birth missing (living people)
Living people
 
Intelligence agencies
Intelligence agencies
Intelligence agencies